Hemidactylus klauberi is a species of gecko, a lizard in the family Gekkonidae. The species is endemic to Somalia.

Etymology
The specific name, klauberi, is in honor of American herpetologist Laurence Monroe Klauber.

Reproduction
H. klauberi is oviparous.

References

Further reading
Lanza B (1990). "Amphibians and reptiles of the Somali Democratic Republic: check list and biogeography". Biogeographia 14: 407–465. (Hemidactylus klauberi, p. 415).
Scortecci G (1948). "Un nuovo Hemidactylus della Somalia ". Bollettino dei Musei e degli Istituti Biologici dell'Università di Genova 22: 51–55. (Hemidactylus klauberi, new species). (in Italian).

Hemidactylus
Reptiles described in 1948
Endemic fauna of Somalia
Reptiles of Somalia